The Tribunals and Inquiries Act 1992 is an Act of Parliament in the United Kingdom which sets out the powers and functions of the Council on Tribunals.

References

External links
Tribunals and Inquiries Act 1992

United Kingdom Acts of Parliament 1992
United Kingdom tribunals